Shooting has been a sport of the Pan American Games since the inaugural 1951 Pan American Games.

Medal table

References

 
Sports at the Pan American Games
Pan American Games